Bercellino is an Italian surname. Notable people with the surname include:

Giancarlo Bercellino (born 1941), Italian footballer
Silvino Bercellino (born 1946), Italian footballer, brother of Giancarlo

Italian-language surnames